SPRY4-IT1 is a long non-coding RNA which is located within an intron of the SPRY4 gene. Its expression is upregulated in melanoma cells, where it is expressed in the cytoplasm. Removal of its expression by RNAi causes defects in cell-growth and differentiation and increased rates of apoptosis, suggesting that it may have a role in melanoma development.

See also
 Long noncoding RNA

References

Non-coding RNA